Working Holiday! is a compilation album released on the Simple Machines label in 1994. It is a collection of tracks by American indie bands which were originally released on a series of 12 7" singles by Simple Machines as part of the Working Holiday monthly record club starting from December 1992. Each song was intended to commemorate a holiday in the month it was released. Subscribers to the record club were also sent a calendar showing the holidays, and a specially made 7" single carrying box.

A limited edition of the Working Holiday! album contained a second disc of live performances from a three-day live music festival held in January 1994 at The Black Cat in Washington D.C. to celebrate the completion of the Working Holiday series. The 20-page CD booklet issued with all editions of the album contains a detailed and illustrated account of the record club project and the live music festival.

Track listing 
Disc 1 - 7"s on Holiday!

11:59 It's January - Scrawl
Tin Foil Star - Versus
Abraham Lincoln - Lungfish
James Brown - The Tinklers
Ides - Codeine
Working Holiday - The Coctails
Roll Away the Stone - Eggs
Christmas Trees Everywhere - Jonny Cohen
Saints Above - Veronica Lake
Where Is Our Reason - My Dad Is Dead
Kiss Me - Rastro!
Another Child Bride - Nothing Painted Blue
Indie - Lois
If You Hurt Me - Small Factory
Kidding on the Square - Tsunami
Falk - Jawbox
Back to School - Crackerbash
Under the Ground - Grifters
Coalmine #666 - Crain
A Penny for the Guy - Pitchblende
Night of the Chill Blue - Superchunk
Winter's Come - Caterpillar

Disc 2 - Live tracks from the Working Holiday Weekend with MC Jason Noble
Hello!
Big Puffy Girl Handwriting - Danielle Howle
Fun Fun Fun in the Sun Sun Sun - The Tinklers
Not Coe - David Greenberger
Whoopsy Daisy - The Coctails
Broken Heart of a Neutron Star - Crain
Flax - Pitchblende
Why am I so tired all the time? - Eggs
Might - Archers of Loaf
From the Curve - Superchunk
Newspaper - Tsunami
Rubberman - Jonny Cohen
The Girl with the Carrot Skin - Bricks
Lady Putney - Caterpillar
Big Things, Little Things - Rodan
Sleeping through the Jane Pratt Show - Franklin Bruno
Hacienda - Versus

Artwork by Archer Prewitt. Disc 2 recorded January 7, 8, 9 1994 at The Black Cat by Bob Weston, Geoff Turner and Charles Bennington.

References

External links
Working Holiday! page at Simple Machines records

Record label compilation albums
Music festival compilation albums
1994 live albums
1994 compilation albums
Indie rock compilation albums
Live indie rock albums